This list of museum ships in North America is a list of notable museum ships located in the continent of North America and it may include ones in overseas parts of Canada and the United States.  This includes "ships preserved in museums" defined broadly, but is intended to be limited to substantial (large) ships or, in a few cases, very notable boats or dugout canoes or the like.  This does not include submarines; see List of submarine museums for those.  This includes ships formerly serving as museums or preserved at museums, as well as current ones.  This includes ships on static display or floating and sometimes used for excursions.  It includes only genuine historic ships; replica ships, some associated with museums, are listed separately in the List of ship replicas.

Some historic ships actively used for excursions, and not previously or currently associated with museums, are included in the list of classic vessels.  For shipwrecks that may be visited by diving, including some perhaps associated with museums, see List of shipwrecks.

Ships whose coordinates are included below may be seen together in map accessed by clicking on "Map all coordinates using OpenStreetMap" at the right side of this page.

Canada 

former

Cuba

Mexico 

former

United States

Alabama

Alaska

Arkansas

California 

Former

Connecticut

Florida 

former

Hawaii 

Former

Illinois

Indiana

Iowa

Louisiana

Maryland

Massachusetts

Michigan 

Former

Minnesota 

former

Mississippi 

Former

Missouri 

Former

Nebraska

New Jersey

New York

North Carolina

Ohio

Oregon 

Former

Pennsylvania 

Former

Rhode Island

South Carolina

Texas

Vermont

Virginia

Washington D.C.

Washington

Wisconsin

Former 
Former

See also
 List of Great Lakes museum and historic ships
 List of lightships of the United States
 List of maritime museums in the United States
 List of museum ships of the United States military
 Barcelona Charter
 List of ancient ships
 List of classic vessels
 List of oldest surviving ships
 Ship replica
 Ships preserved in museums
 Viking ship replica

Notes

References

External links 
 Historic Naval Ships Visitors' Guide
 Historic Ocean Liners of the World
 Maritime Heritage Network of the Pacific Northwest
 National Park Service Maritime Heritage Program
 Naval and Maritime Museums List International (Except USA)
 Naval and Maritime Museums List United States of America
 National Register of Historic Vessels (United Kingdom)
 Submarine Museums in the United States
 World Ship Trust International Register of Historic Ships

Ships